The Smith-McCurry House is a historic house on Arkansas Highway 15,  east of El Dorado, Arkansas.  The oldest portion of the house is a single-story dog trot house that was built in 1867 by Lawson Smith for his son David Carroll Smith.  The house was inherited in 1919 by Mamie Smith McCurry, notable as a prominent investor in early oil exploration in Union County.  The third well in the county, a successful gusher, was drilled on her land.  She then invested further in oil exploration, forming a partnership with Bruce Hunt, a geologist, and the drillers Hensy and Zoda, and eventually participating in exploratory drilling operations in seven states.  She used proceeds from her oil successes to expand the homestead and add then-popular Craftsman details to it.

The house was listed on the National Register of Historic Places in 1992.

See also
National Register of Historic Places listings in Union County, Arkansas

References

Houses on the National Register of Historic Places in Arkansas
Greek Revival houses in Arkansas
Houses completed in 1867
Houses in Union County, Arkansas
National Register of Historic Places in Union County, Arkansas
1867 establishments in Arkansas
American Craftsman architecture in Arkansas